Fredrick Sheldon  (born 1871) was an English footballer who played in the Football League for Stoke.

Career
Sheldon was born in Stoke-upon-Trent and played for Stoke St.Peter's and then joined Stoke in the Football League. He was made back up 'keeper to Ezekiel Johnston and in two seasons with the club he played in eight matches. He left in May 1898 to play for Eccleshall.

Career statistics

References

English footballers
Stoke City F.C. players
English Football League players
1871 births
Year of death missing
Association football goalkeepers